Jimmy Ray Wyrick (born December 31, 1976) is a former American football cornerback in the National Football League. He played college football at Minnesota.

Born in Antioch, California, Wyrick grew up in DeSoto, Texas and graduated from DeSoto High School in 1995. At the University of Minnesota, Wyrick redshirted his true freshman season, played at wide receiver for the Minnesota Golden Gophers in 1996, before switching to defensive back for his last two seasons in 1997 and 1999. He sat out the 1998 season due to a foot injury.

He was signed by the Detroit Lions as an undrafted free agent in 2000 and played for the Lions from 2000 to 2003. Wyrick also played for the Miami Dolphins from 2003 to 2004.

After retiring from football, Wyrick became a firefighter and paramedic with the Dallas Fire-Rescue Department.

References

External links

NFL.com profile

1976 births
Living people
American football cornerbacks
American football wide receivers
Minnesota Golden Gophers football players
Detroit Lions players
Miami Dolphins players
People from DeSoto, Texas
Players of American football from Texas
People from Antioch, California
Players of American football from California
Sportspeople from the Dallas–Fort Worth metroplex
Sportspeople from the San Francisco Bay Area